George Sumner Hand was a Colonial Anglican Bishop in the first half of the 20th century.

He was educated at Bloxham School and  St John's College, Oxford. He was Rector  of St Lawrence with St Gregory, Norwich and later was Dean of St John's Cathedral, Antigua before his elevation to the episcopate as bishop of that island in 1937; he was consecrated a bishop on St Peter's Day 1937 (29 June), by Cosmo Lang, Archbishop of Canterbury, at St Paul's Cathedral. He retired in 1944 and died the following year.

Notes

Date of birth unknown
People educated at Bloxham School
Alumni of St John's College, Oxford
Deans of Antigua
20th-century Anglican bishops in the Caribbean
Anglican bishops of Antigua
1945 deaths